The Homestead is a  Grade II listed  house at Church Road, Barnes, London SW13, built in about 1720.

Notable residents
The Scottish physician, librarian, and medical historian Robert Willis lived and practised there from 1846 until his death in 1878.

Sir Ralph Moor, high commissioner of the British Southern Nigeria Protectorate poisoned himself there in 1909. The coroner's jury determined that "the poison was deliberately taken whilst temporarily insane after suffering acutely from insomnia", having heard evidence that Moor had suffered for the last four years on his return from Africa with malarial and backwater fever that induced insomnia.

References

External links

Barnes, London
Grade II listed buildings in the London Borough of Richmond upon Thames
Grade II listed houses in London